The 12th Kaunas Infantry Regiment was an infantry regiment that served in the Lithuanian Army from 1920 to 1924. In 1923, it was reformed into the 4th Border Regiment and later that year into the 4th Separate Border Battalion, both of which were tasked with the protection of the Lithuanian demarcation line with Poland and to prevent the illegal movement of persons and smuggling across the border.

1920 
The regiment was founded on 14 October 1920. The regiment's core were parts of the Command companies of Suvalkai and Eglainė. The regiment was part of the 4th Infantry Division. By November, the regiment is in Vilkaviškis and protects the Foch Line from Vištytis to Kalvarija.

1921 
In 1921, the regiment was moved to Veiveriai district. In November 1921, the regiment moves to Alytus. From 1921, the regiment feast was on October 14, its founding date.

1923 
According to different sources, the regiment was reformed into the 4th Border Regiment on 2 or 12 May 1923. The other infantry regiments of the 4th Division, the 10th and 11th, were also renamed, to the 2nd and 3rd Border Regiments, respectively. The regiment was part of the Border Division, while the battalion was part of the Border Brigade. On 15 or 30 November 1923, it is made into the 4th Separate Border Battalion and is relocated to Lyduokiai. On 21 December 1923, the battalion moves to Ukmergė. The battalion is disbanded on 1 March 1924.

Commander 
The regiment's commander was Colonel Vincas Šaudzis.

References

Sources 
 
 
 
 
 

Military units and formations established in 1920
Military units and formations disestablished in 1924
Infantry regiments of Lithuania